Petro Mykolayovych Buts (born 2 June 1966) is a Ukrainian professional football coach and a former player. He works as an assistant coach with FC Peremoha Dnipro.

Honours
 Soviet Top League champion: 1988.
 Soviet Top League runner-up: 1989.
 Soviet Cup winner: 1989.
 USSR Federation Cup winner: 1989.
 USSR Federation Cup finalist: 1990.

External links
 

1966 births
Sportspeople from Kryvyi Rih
Living people
Soviet footballers
Ukrainian footballers
Association football defenders
FC Kryvbas Kryvyi Rih players
FC Dnipro players
CS Tiligul-Tiras Tiraspol players
FC Nyva Ternopil players
MFC Mykolaiv players
FC Polissya Zhytomyr players
FC Amkar Perm players
FC Ordabasy players
FC Kairat players
FC Aktobe players
Soviet Top League players
Ukrainian Premier League players
Ukrainian First League players
Moldovan Super Liga players
Kazakhstan Premier League players
Ukrainian expatriate footballers
Expatriate footballers in Moldova
Expatriate footballers in Russia
Expatriate footballers in Kazakhstan